The Steppe is a 1977 Soviet drama film directed by Sergei Bondarchuk.

Plot 
The film is an adaptation of the eponymous novel by Anton Chekhov.

Cast 
 Oleg Kuznetsov as Yegorushka
Vladimir Sedov as Kuzmichyov
 Nikolay Trofimov as Father Khristofor
 Sergei Bondarchuk as Yemelyan
 Ivan Lapikov as Pantelei
 Georgi Burkov as Vasya
Stanislav Lyubshin as Konstantin Zvonyk
Innokenty Smoktunovsky as Moisei Moiseyevich
 Anatoly Vasilyev as Dymov
Valery Zakhariev as Styopka
Igor Kvasha as Solomon Moiseyevich
Lillian Malkina as Roza
Irina Skobtseva as Countess Dranitskaya
Natalya Andrejchenko as girl on sheaves
Mikhail Gluzsky as Varlamov
 Mikhail Kokshenov as Kiryukha
Vasily Livanov as Kazimir

References

External links 
 

1977 films
1977 drama films
Films directed by Sergei Bondarchuk
Mosfilm films
1970s Russian-language films
Soviet drama films